The Guilty Demos is a demo version of the Barbra Streisand album Guilty by Barry Gibb. Not intended for release tapes of these had been circulating among fans before bootleg CDs started emerging. In October 2006 Gibb made these available through iTunes.

Recording
Recorded in October 1979 after the Bee Gees' 1979 Spirits Having Flown Tour, all of the songs were written that same year except "The Love Inside" which was written in 1978 during work on the album Spirits Having Flown. All songs features Gibb's falsetto voice, except "What Kind of Fool" where he used his natural voice. Barry said that they sent five songs he wrote with Robin. The end date of the Spirits Having Flown Tour is 6 October and at that time Robin left Miami to stay for a few months at his house in Long Island, New York. The next songs were written with Albhy Galuten instead of Robin. The songs on which Barry written with Galuten were dated after Robin left Miami. Galuten recalls Barry writing songs very fast in a week, and taking only a little longer to record the demos.. The demo version of "Never Give Up" remains unreleased. "Carried Away" and "Secrets" were not used by Streisand but instead recorded by Elaine Paige with only "Secrets" being issued on her 1981 self-titled album. Olivia Newton-John recorded and released "Carried Away" on her Physical album also in 1981.

Track listing

Personnel
Barry Gibb — vocals, guitar
Albhy Galuten — keyboard, synthesiser, drum machine

References

Barry Gibb albums
2006 albums
Demo albums
Albums produced by Barry Gibb